Kosciuscola is a genus of grasshoppers in the subfamily Oxyinae (tribe Praxibulini). They are found in Australia.

Species
Species include:
Kosciuscola cognatus Rehn, 1957
Kosciuscola cuneatus Rehn, 1957
Kosciuscola tasmanicus Rehn, 1957
Kosciuscola tristis Sjöstedt, 1934 - type species (K. tristis tristis of 2 subsp.)
Kosciuscola usitatus Rehn, 1957

Gallery

References

Oxyinae
Acrididae genera
Orthoptera of Australia